Paracroma is a genus of moths of the family Erebidae. The genus was erected by Paul Dognin in 1914.

Species
Paracroma mutilum Dognin, 1914
Paracroma zamora Dognin, 1914

References

Herminiinae